Adam Kazimierz Kolawa (June 25, 1957 – April 26, 2011) was CEO and co-founder of Parasoft, a software company in Monrovia, CA that makes software development tools.

History 

Kolawa received a M.Sc. in Electrical Engineering from the AGH University of Science and Technology in 1981 and a M.Sc. in Physics from Jagiellonian University in 1982. After Kolawa emigrated from Poland to the United States, he earned a Ph.D in Theoretical Physics from the California Institute of Technology. While at Caltech, he worked with Geoffrey Fox and helped design and implement the Intel hypercube parallel computer known as the Cosmic Cube.

In 1987, he founded Parasoft with four friends from Caltech. Initially, the company focused on parallel processing technologies. Kolawa co-authored two books on Development Testing and Software Testing In 2001, Kolawa was awarded the Los Angeles Ernst & Young's Entrepreneur of the Year Award in the Software category.

Kolawa was granted 20 patents for software technologies he has invented. His patents include runtime memory error detection technology (Patent  and   - granted in 1998), statically analyzing source code quality using rules (Patent  - granted in 1999), and automated unit test case generation technology  (Patent  and   - granted in 1998).

Kolawa died suddenly on April 26, 2011.

Publications

Books

References

External links
 Parasoft Executive Biographies
 Exclusive JDJ Industry Profile: Dr Adam Kolawa, CEO, Parasoft
 Unlocking the Power of Automation: Exclusive Q&A with Dr Adam Kolawa, Co-founder & CEO of Parasoft

Businesspeople in software
American computer businesspeople
American technology chief executives
California Institute of Technology alumni
American technology writers
1957 births
2011 deaths